The 2014 East Carolina Pirates football team represented East Carolina University in the 2014 NCAA Division I FBS football season. They were led by fifth-year head coach Ruffin McNeill and played their home games at Dowdy–Ficklen Stadium. This was East Carolina's first season as members of the American Athletic Conference. They finished the season 8–5, 5–3 in AAC play to finish in a tie for fourth place. They were invited to the Birmingham Bowl where they lost to Florida.

Schedule

Schedule Source:

Game summaries

North Carolina Central

South Carolina

Virginia Tech

North Carolina

SMU

South Florida

UConn

Temple

Cincinnati

Tulane

Tulsa

Central Florida

Birmingham Bowl

Rankings

References

East Carolina
East Carolina Pirates football seasons
East Carolina Pirates football